Randall J. Radtke (born October 23, 1951 in Watertown, Wisconsin), is a former member of the Wisconsin State Assembly. He graduated from Watertown High School as well as the University of Wisconsin–Whitewater and the University of Wisconsin–Madison. He is married with two children and is a member of the Knights of Columbus.

Career
Radtke was first elected to the Assembly in 1978 and served through 1992. He is a Republican.

He has been an active member of the Friends of Aztalan State Park, which has been noted as Wisconsin's premier archaeological site.

References

Politicians from Watertown, Wisconsin
Republican Party members of the Wisconsin State Assembly
University of Wisconsin–Whitewater alumni
University of Wisconsin–Madison alumni
1951 births
Living people
20th-century American politicians